The Singing Voice of Japan (Nihon no Utagoe / うたごえ運動, Utagoe-undō) is the name of a social and political movement that emerged after World War II in Japan and based on musical and choral activities of the working class of the entire nation. On the ideological position of communism or democratic socialism, activists of the movement organize choral circles in factories, in schools and in their residential areas. The movement reached its peak in the years 1950–60. Japanese singer Akiko Seki is generally regarded as the founder of the Singing Voice of Japan.

History

 May 1, 1946: In the occasion of the first May Day post-war in Tokyo, Akiko Seki conducted L'internationale and a Japanese version of The Red Flag; this experience led her to the creation of a national musical movement of the working class.
 February 10, 1948: Akiko Seki created the Choir of the Communist Youth League of Japan  in Tokyo, as the core of national musical movement of the working class.
 June 1949: First issue of the periodical Singing Voice, organ of the Choir of the Communist Youth League of Japan.
 November 29, 1953: First national festival of the Singing voice of Japan in Tokyo, in the halls Hibiya Kōkaidō (日比谷公会堂) and Kanda Kyōristu Kōdō (神田共立講堂).
 February 14, 1955: Permanent institution of the Executive Committee of the Festival of the Singing Voice of Japan.
 December 20, 1955: Akiko Seki received the Stalin Peace Prize.
 May 1960: Statement of the Executive Committee of the Festival opposing the renewal of Treaty of Mutual Cooperation and Security between the United States and Japan.
 November 7, 1967: Première of a partial version of the opera Okinawa in Naha (Okinawa).  
 November 25, 1967: First local performance in Tokyo, of the partial version of the opera  Okinawa , in the Nippon Budōkan (日本武道館).
 December 10, 1969: First performance of the complete version of the opera  Okinawa  in Tokyo, in the hall Shibuya Kōkaidō (渋谷公会堂).
 April 1971: First issue of the quarterly organ of the executive committee of the Festival.
 February 25, 1974: Radical revision of the organizational system of the executive committee, adopted during its sixth national congress: renaming the committee "National Council of the Singing Voice of Japan".

Musical repertoire and organization 
The repertoire of the movement consists mainly in revolutionary songs and those of the working class of different nations. Among registered members of individual committees (distinguished by region, industrial union, and other criterion) of the singing voice of Japan is favored to create new songs and choral pieces in the genre suited to the needs of their group. According to the program adopted in 2013, the National Council of the singing voice of Japan aims the objective to include 500 units and choral circles allover the national territory of Japan.

Origin of the Hiragana script (うたごえ) for the name of the movement
Traditionally, the two initial words of the movement's official name Singing Voice are not expressed in Kanji as would be standard today, but in Hiragana that is: うたごえ (Utagoe written in Hiragana) instead of　歌声 (the same in Kanji). And at least since the first national Festival of the movement in 1953, its title text was written in Hiragana: The singing voice is the vitality of peace - The Singing Voice of Japan 1953. Concerning the origin of such a particular script,  who was one of the founding members of the Choir of the Communist Youth League of Japan, recalled the moment of publication of the first choir organ Utagoe (June 1949) in these terms:

{|class="wikitable"
|...When we decided to create the periodical organ of the Choir, I was in charge of all the task. It was my idea to name it with the words Singing Voice in Hiragana script, because at that time these words were not well diffused, so this might have been one of the most important works of my career. Thus I entitled it in Hiragana because the aim of the movement was to involve even a large part of the working class that could not have graduated the secondary school.
|}

However, even after the first issue of the choir organ, the script for the Japanese word Utagoe in Kanji (歌声) and one mixed with Hiragana (歌ごえ) were sometimes used by authors of books or periodicals concerning The Singing Voice of Japan, while an exclusive formalization of Hiragana script (うたごえ) has never been imposed by any official organization of the movement. A very remarkable example of the graphical oscillation would be the autograph of Akiko Seki dedicated to the national Festival of December 1962, in which she wrote one of the movement slogans The singing voice is the vitality of peace using mixed script of both Kanji and Hiragana for the word Utagoe, precisely such as: 歌こえ [sic].

Relationship with the Japanese Communist Party 
In accordance with the slogan Let's sing for the struggle (of the working class), activists of the movement have composed many songs to encourage workers protest against illegal discrimination of their employers. In the 1960s, instruction of militants of the movement and continued improvement of their ideological, political and artistic quality were considered important means of cultural policy by the Japanese Communist Party. Nowadays (2016), the only group that is active and explicitly dedicated to the support of JCP is Choir of JCP-fans, established in 2011 in Kyoto by veteran activists of the movement and directed by Tadao Yamamoto, composer, accordionist, choir director and an ordinary member of the National Council of The Singing Voice of Japan: the choir witnesses the historical connection calling itself by the acronym of English official name of the party. Its repertory and artistic activity are strongly linked in the movement, and in various cultural events organized by the Party, the Choir of JCP-fans appears as an element among the joined choirs of the volunteer singers of The Singing Voice of Japan.

Notable concerts and performances of the Choir:
February 11, 2011, Kyoto Kaikan Hall: Concert sponsored by the Kyoto Committee of the JCP.
August 1, 2013, Nishijin Bunka Center (Kyoto): Cultural Live Revolutionary Pub, in collaboration with Tokiko Nishiyama, former JCP member of the House of Councilors. 
September 23, 2014, Takaragaike Park (Kyoto): Festival Kyoto ed.2014, organized by the Kyoto Committee of the JCP.
February 1, 2015, Kyoiku Bunka Center (Kyoto): Festival sponsored by the Kyoto Committee of the JCP.
April 29, 2016, Takaragaike Park (Kyoto): Festival Kyoto ed.2016, organized by the Kyoto Committee of the JCP: performance with Seifuku Kōjō Iinkai (制服向上委員会) and Akira Koike (小池晃), JCP member of the House of Councilors, and Secretary-General of the Party.

Episode of a Minister of Finance who tried to show his cultural competence uttering the name of the movement
In 1963, during a discussion in the Budget Committee of the House of Councillors of Japan around taxes to impose on entry tickets to theaters, Gorō Sudō, a member of the Japanese Communist Party and militant of The Singing Voice of Japan, asked Kakuei Tanaka, Minister of Finance at the time, if he knew of the existence of an workers' association of concert goers. To such a question, Minister Tanaka had to answer: "I do not know well about it". So Sudō recommenced his speech but the Minister who listened for a moment the continuation of the speech interrupted Sudō, uttering: "The Singing Voice...", then Sudō replied: "Not The Singing Voice of Japan. I am speaking of an association of music listeners. The Singing Voice of Japan is a movement for singers",.

Personalities and historical activists 
 Akiko Seki (関鑑子): singer, founder of the movement (1899–1973)
 Sakae Araki (荒木栄): composer (1924–1962)
 Gorō Sudō (須藤五郎): composer, conductor, JCP member of the House of Councilors (1897–1988)
 Yoritoyo Inoue (井上頼豊): cellist (1912–1996)
 Katsura Nakazawa (中澤桂): soprano (1933–2016)
 Nobuo Terahara (寺原伸夫): composer (1928–1998)
 Hikaru Hayashi (林光): composer (1931–2012)
 Yūzō Toyama (外山雄三): conductor (1931–)
 Susumu Ōnishi (大西進): composer (1931–)
 Nobuo Sugimoto (杉本信夫): composer, musicologist (1934–)
 Kiminobu Sōma (相馬公信): composer, choir singer (1942–)
 Tadao Yamamoto (山本忠生): composer (1939–)
 Hiromi Fujimoto (藤本洋): poet (1932–)
 Daisuke Doi (土井大助): poet (1927–2014)
 Taku Izumi (いずみたく): composer (1930–1992)
 Kōji Kinoshita (木下航二): composer (1925–1999)

Bibliography

General history of the movement
Various authors: The Singing Voice of Japan - collection of favorite songs: definitive edition (special issue of the magazine Chisei, Tokyo, 1956). Library catalog of the Miyagi Gakuin Women's University[JA]. 「日本のうたごえ: 決定版 愛唱歌集」（雑誌「知性」1956年増刊号：東京、河出書房）
Toshio Itoya: History of labors' and revolutionary songs (Tokyo, 1970). NDL Search[JA]. 糸屋寿雄「労働歌・革命歌物語」（東京、1970年）
Akiko Seki: Since I am bewitched by the singing voice (Tokyo, 1971). NDL Search[JA]. 関鑑子「歌ごえに魅せられて」（東京、1971年）
Nishio Jirouhei and Tamotsu Yazawa: Japanese revolutionary songs (Tokyo, 1974). NDL Search[JA]. 西尾治郎平、矢沢保 編「日本の革命歌」（東京、1974年）
Yoritoyo Inoue: Singing voice, spread your wings (Tokyo, 1978). NDL Search[JA]. 井上頼豊 編「うたごえよ翼ひろげて: 1948-1978」（東京、1978年）
Tamotsu Yazawa: Singing voice for freedom and revolution (Tokyo, 1978). NDL Search[JA]. 矢沢保「自由と革命の歌ごえ」（東京、1978年）
Various authors: Introduction to The Singing Voice of Japan - commemorating the 30th anniversary of the movement, in: Kikan Nihon no Utagoe (Quarterly theoretical organ of the National Council of The Singing Voice of Japan, December 1978). NDL Search[JA]. 「30周年記念 うたごえ運動入門」（日本のうたごえ全国協議会理論誌「季刊日本のうたごえ」1978年12月号）
Hiromi Fujimoto: Singing for the struggle of the working class - History of The Singing Voice of Japan (Tokyo, 1980). Catalogue of the Prefectural Library of Nagasaki[JA]. 藤本洋「うたは闘いとともに: うたごえの歩み」（東京、1980年）

History of specific aspects of the movement
Hiromi Fujimoto: Singing for the struggle of the working class - History of the Choir Chūō (Tokyo, 1971). NDL Search[JA]. 藤本洋「歌はたたかいとともに: 中央合唱団のあゆみ」（東京、1971年）
Various authors: Great red rose: memories around Akiko Seki (Tokyo, 1981). NDL Search[JA]. 関鑑子追想集編集委員会 編「大きな紅ばら: 関鑑子追想集」(東京、1981年)
Yaeko Morita: Let this victory resonate, roar: life of Sakae Araki (Tokyo, 1983). NDL Search[JA]. 森田ヤエ子「この勝利ひびけとどろけ: 荒木栄の生涯」（東京、1983年）
Kuniyoshi Kōya: Songs and life of Sakae Araki, composer of the working class (Tokyo, 1985). NDL Search[JA]. 神谷国善「労働者作曲家 荒木栄の歌と生涯」（東京、1985年）
Saburō Hino: Rails, sing in full voice - the romanticism of railway workers (Tokyo, 1988). NDL Search[JA]. 日野三朗「レールよ高らかにうたえ: 鉄路に生きる男のロマン」（東京、1988年）
Various authors: Resonate, singing voice for peace - the movement of The Singing Voice of Japan under the US military occupation in Okinawa (Haebaru [Okinawa], 2004). NDL Search[JA]. 沖縄のうたごえ運動編集委員会 企画・編集「ひびけ平和のうたごえ: 米軍占領下の沖縄のうたごえ運動」（沖縄・南風原町、2004年）
Tsuneko Nara: Memory of my life for The Singing Voice of Japan (Tokyo, 2007). NDL Search[JA]. 奈良恒子「うたごえに生きて」（東京、2007年）

Dissertations

See also

Japanese Communist Party
Democratic Youth League of Japan (successor of the Communist Youth League of Japan)
Choir of JCP-fans

References

External links
 (ja) Official website of the National Council of The Singing Voice of Japan 日本のうたごえ全国協議会ホームページ
 (ja) Journal of The Singing Voice of Japan うたごえ新聞ホームページ
 (en) Official website of the Japanese Communist Party 日本共産党ホームページ（英語）
 (ja) Official website of the Democratic Youth League of Japan 日本民主青年同盟ホームページ
 (ja) The opera Okinawa produced by the Executive Committee of the Festival of the Singing Voice of Japan (1967–1972) 歌劇「沖縄」について

Japanese Communist Party
Political movements in Japan
Social movements in Japan